Gitta Poulsgaard Jensen (born 18 July 1972) is a retired Danish swimmer who won three relay medals at the World and European championships in 1991. She also competed at the 1988 and 1992 Summer Olympics in nine events; her best achievement was sixth place in the 4 × 100 m freestyle relay in 1992.

References

1972 births
Danish female swimmers
Swimmers at the 1992 Summer Olympics
Swimmers at the 1988 Summer Olympics
Danish female freestyle swimmers
Olympic swimmers of Denmark
Living people
World Aquatics Championships medalists in swimming
European Aquatics Championships medalists in swimming
People from Esbjerg
Sportspeople from the Region of Southern Denmark